In the Summer of His Years may refer to:

 In the Summer of His Years (album), a 1963 album by Connie Francis
 "In the Summer of His Years" (song), a 1963 song written by Herb Kretzmer and David Lee
 "In the Summer of His Years" (Bee Gees song), 1968